Gursaran Singh Sehmi (17 February 1931 – 30 June 2009) was a Kenyan field hockey player. He competed at the 1956 Summer Olympics and the 1960 Summer Olympics.

References

External links
 

1931 births
2009 deaths
Kenyan male field hockey players
Olympic field hockey players of Kenya
Field hockey players at the 1956 Summer Olympics
Field hockey players at the 1960 Summer Olympics
Sportspeople from Nairobi
Kenyan people of Indian descent
Kenyan people of Punjabi descent